Oliver Christianson, also known as Revilo ("Oliver", spelled backwards), is an American cartoonist who has worked with both Hallmark Cards and Penthouse magazine, among others. Some of his illustrations have been collected into the books Talk to the Tail, Women of Substance and Funny Business.

Biography 
Christianson was born in southern California, and was an illustration major at California State University, Long Beach. He served as a U.S. Navy corpsman during the Vietnam war, where he was stationed at Da Nang Naval Hospital.

Awards 
Christianson received the National Cartoonist Society Divisional Award for Greeting Cards in 2001, and a nomination for the same award in 2002.

References

External links
Billy Ireland Cartoon Library & Museum Art Database

Year of birth missing (living people)
Living people
American cartoonists
Artists from California
California State University, Long Beach alumni